The Bambuco Pageant and Folkloric Festival is the largest and most important celebration in Huila Department and one of the most important celebrations in southern Colombia. It is celebrated annually in the city of Neiva during the Feast of Saints Peter and Paul and attracts a considerable number of Colombian and foreign tourists. The festival was declared National Cultural heritage by the Congress of Colombia in 2006.

The Festivity is formed by three events, the Folkloric Festival, the Bambuco Pageant and the International Folklore Exposition. The Festival celebrates Bambuco music.

History
Since the 18th century, locals celebrated obedience to the Spanish monarch in the months of June and July, as well as the Feast of Saint Peter and Saint John.  At the time, Saint John's Feast was a rural festivity while Saint Peter's was celebrated in the cities.

In 1960, the festivities were officialized and the Festival Folclórico y Reinado Nacional del Bambuco were established.

Reinado Nacional del Bambuco
The Reinado Nacional del Bambuco is a contest similar to beauty pageants in which contestants, each representing a Colombian Department, are judged on six parameters: Performance of Sanjuanero dance, beauty, general knowledge, popularity, punctuality and performance of regional dance. Of these, the performance of the Sanjuanero dance grants the most points, followed by beauty. The contests' winner is declared as the National Bambuco Queen (Spanish: Reina Nacional del Bambuco). It has been made in 57 uninterrupted editions from 1961 to 2017, the first winning department was Huila while the most recent and current winner of the title is Huila as well.  In the 57 editions a total of 21 territorial entities (20 departments and Bogotá) have obtained at least one crown, the department that has won the most is the host department, Huila, with a total of 7 crowns, followed by Atlántico with 6, Meta and Caquetá both with 5 and Valle del Cauca with 4, the information of all the winning departments with their respective years is shown below:

By Department

Festival activities
"Anselmo Durán Plazas" National Music Performing Contest.
"Jorge Villamil Cordovez" National Music Composition Contest.
"Inés García de Durán" National and International Dance Encounter.

References

External links
 
 Ferias & Fiestas que no te puedes Perder, Colombia. 

 

Cultural festivals in Colombia
Tourist attractions in Huila Department
Dance in Colombia
Bambuco
Recurring events established in 1960
Folk festivals in Colombia
Music festivals established in 1960
Music festivals in Colombia
Dance festivals in Colombia